The Ministry of Health and environment of Iraq was formed in 1920.

Its task is to provide health and medical services to every Iraqi citizen during normal and emergency circumstances in the country. The ministry also administrates the affairs of health and medical cadres in Iraq. It has a responsibility to provide best requirements of curative and health preventive security to all individuals of society. Health services have been developed by the ministry of health and its facilities. Consultative and service facilities expanded in a remarkable way. Iraqi people, hospitals and health centers suffered from wars and destruction. But, in spite of all these circumstances, health ministry and its cadres could provide best services to Iraqi citizens.

The Ministry of Health in Iraqi-Kurdistan region is considered the main official institution, established in 1992 during the formation of the Kurdistan Government.

The Minister since May 2020 is Hassam Mohammed.

The health ministry demanded the government to have $3.8 billion budget noting that the ministry needs the amount to upgrade the health situation in Iraq.

Departmental structure

First Deputy
Blood Transfusion Center
Health Education Dept.
Finance & Auditing Dept.
 Second Deputy
Liver Center
Cosmetics Center
Heart Center
Cancer Center
Forensic Medicine
International Health Dept
Diabetes Center
Poisoning Info. Center
Bone Marrow Center
Impotence Center
 Popular Clinic Directorate
 Baghdad Health Directorate / Rusafa
 Baghdad Health Directorate / Karkh
 Saddam Medical City Directorate
 Yarmouk Medical Directorate
 Directorates of Health in all Governorates
 Directorate of Health Planning
Manpower Dept
Nursing Dept.
Statistics Dept.
Finance & Planning Dept
Training of Staff Dept.
Training of Staff Dept.
Building Planning Dept.
Self finances Dept.
Technical Affair Directorate
Laboratory Dept.
Pharmacy Dept.
Oral Health Dept.
Medical Committee Dept.
Curative Dept.
Quality Control Dept.
Consultation Dept.
Admin & Legal Affairs
Legal Dept.
Administration Dept.
Finance Dept.
Personnel Dept.
KIMADIA Company
Planning Dept.
Admin. Dept.
Drug Dist. Dept.
Drug Information Dept.
Finance Dept.
Printing Dept.
Technical Dept.
Vaccine & Sera Dept.
Equipment Dist. Dept.
Legal Dept.
Warehouses Dept.
Import Dept.
Repair Dept.
Inspection
Governmental Fac. Dept.
Non Governmental Fac. Dept.
Claims Dept.
Evaluation Dept.
Drug & Equipment Dept.
Technical Dept.
Industrial Security Dept.
Prevention
Public Health Lab.
PHC
Nutrient Dept.
Health Inspection Dept.
Aids Center
CDC

See also
 Ministry of Health (Kurdistan)
List of hospitals in Iraq
 The New Iraqi Journal of Medicine

External links 
 
 Kurdistan DOH
 who
 War Takes Toll on Baghdad Psychiatric Hospital 
 Mental health in Iraq
 Iraqi Medical Association
 U.S. Gives Iraqi Hospitals Broken Promises in Place of Medicine 
 Clean Environment for Al Sadr Teaching Hospital
 Health Ministry Demands $3.8 Billion Budget in 2009 

Iraq
Healthcare in Iraq
Health